Charlotte Smith (June 9, 1893 – December 9, 1936), known professionally as Lottie Pickford, was a Canadian-American silent film actress and socialite. She was the younger sister of fellow actress Mary Pickford and elder sister of actor Jack Pickford.

One of her best known roles was in The Diamond from the Sky directed by William Desmond Taylor in 1915. Pickford's career often is overshadowed by that of her siblings and though she was a notable figure in the 1920s, her films and role in the Pickford acting family largely are forgotten.

Early years
She was born to John Charles Smith and Charlotte Hennessy. Pickford was named for her mother. She was the middle child, born a year and two months after her sister Gladys Smith and three years before her brother John Charles Smith, who was known as Jack. She quickly became her father's favorite, much to her sister's annoyance. After mistakenly believing she was a boy when first born, her father lovingly gave her the boyish nickname Chuckie.

Pickford's father left the family while she was young, and her sister Gladys took on responsibilities. Lottie and Jack became extremely close, banding together against Gladys, whom they saw as strict. Lottie idolized her brother Jack, and they remained close throughout their lifetimes. Despite her tense relationship with her sister, Lottie was protective of her, and once jumped on D. W. Griffith to defend her sister during a heated argument with the director.

In need of extra income, the family began to act. On January 8, 1900, Gladys and Lottie appeared in The Silver King. Lottie either was offered a lesser sum than her sister or was part of a packaged deal. The family eventually moved to New York City where they all acted in various productions, sometimes together, sometimes not. At one point, Lottie and Gladys had to travel on their own for one production.

Of the family, Gladys was the breakout star. Her family members usually were attached to her as a contractual stipulation. After she started in films, Gladys took the name Mary Pickford. Lottie and Jack also took the surname Pickford in their acting careers. Mary was influential in getting her siblings on the payroll after she started acting in films.

Film career
In 1907, Mary adopted the stage name Mary Pickford. The rest of the family adopted the Pickford name by the time they began appearing in films. Mary signed with D.W. Griffith's Biograph Company in 1909 and secured work for her siblings.

Between 1909 and 1910, Mary made eighty shorts, Jack made twenty-eight, and Lottie made twenty-five. Of the three Pickfords, Lottie's talents were considered the weakest. Actress Linda Arvidson said Mary had claimed her sister was not pretty enough for films, and had done her best to keep her away from Biograph. When the Biograph Company departed for California, Lottie Pickford and her mother were left behind. She would eventually join her sister in California.

Away from her elder sister, Pickford's first starring role came in 1914 in The House of Bondage. It was a vice film, with Pickford playing a prostitute, in stark contrast to her sister's image as "America's Sweetheart". The film did not receive good reviews, being considered too crude. In 1915, Pickford appeared in Fanchon, the Cricket, opposite both her siblings. It is the only film in which all three Pickford siblings appear. It was thought lost until rediscovered in the 20th century at the British Film Institute.

Pickford starred in The Diamond from the Sky serial (1915) although, to her humiliation, she was only given the role after Mary turned it down. A Photoplay article from around the time of the release declared her "Pickford the Second!" and compared her to her sister, albeit as a worthy sequel. The serial was jeopardized when she became pregnant. This incident put her on the unofficial Hollywood blacklist for a short time. Pickford performed in only five roles between 1915 and 1918, when she took a break from acting.

After divorcing her first husband, Pickford next starred in 1921's They Shall Pay which co-starred Allan Forrest, her future husband. Pickford again took several years' time off from acting before returning in a minor role in the 1924 film Dorothy Vernon of Haddon Hall. Her final role was opposite her brother-in-law Douglas Fairbanks Sr. in Don Q Son of Zorro in 1925. During her career, Pickford starred in eight features, and her brother starred in over 40 features.

Personal life
Pickford was a socialite and partying was her first love. She and her brother Jack both struggled with alcoholism. Her parties were legendary and lasted until morning with plentiful drugs and alcohol and nudity. Pickford's maid recalled that when they heard Mary's car pulling in, Pickford and her friends would "Jump into their knickers!"
Despite her reputation as a party girl, Pickford was considered to be down to earth, friendly, sweet, and unpretentious.

Marriages

On an unknown date in 1915, before the release of The Diamond from the Sky, Pickford quietly married New York broker Alfred Rupp. The couple had a daughter in 1915, Mary Pickford Rupp (1915-1984), who later was renamed Gwynne Rupp. The couple separated in 1919 and divorced the following year. For unknown reasons, Pickford allowed her mother Charlotte to legally adopt her daughter, who was renamed Gwynne in 1920. Pickford did not comment to the press on the matter, other than to say she never would marry again. Gwynne lived with her grandmother until Charlotte, Sr.'s death in 1928. At that time, Gwynne's aunt, Mary Pickford, took custody of her. This arrangement lasted until Gwynne married radio announcer Hugh "Bud" Ernst in June 1939.

Lottie Pickford did marry again, to actor Allan Forrest, in January 1922. She obtained a divorce from Forrest in Paris in 1927. 
On July 22, 1929, she married Russel O. Gillard, an undertaker from Los Angeles. They divorced in February 1933 on charges of "extreme cruelty" by her husband. Later that year, Pickford married a Pittsburgh society man named John William Lock. They remained married until her early death in 1936.

Death
On December 9, 1936, Pickford suffered a heart attack at the age of 43. She was said to have been in failing health for three years, related to alcohol abuse. She died at her home in Beverly Hills. Her funeral was held on December 13 at Wee Kirk o' the Heather Church in Glendale, California. She is buried in the Pickford family plot in Forest Lawn Cemetery.

Filmography

Footnotes

References
 Whitfield, Eileen. (1997). Pickford, The Woman Who Made Hollywood. University Press of Kentucky.

Further reading

External links

 Family Photos - The Mary Pickford Foundation

1893 births
1936 deaths
Actresses from Toronto
Burials at Forest Lawn Memorial Park (Glendale)
Canadian film actresses
Canadian silent film actresses
Canadian people of English descent
Canadian people of Irish descent
Canadian expatriate actresses in the United States
People from Old Toronto
20th-century Canadian actresses